Tsuen Wan Government Secondary School (TWGSS; Chinese: 荃灣官立中學 or 荃官 in short) is an EMI co-education secondary school located at 70 Hoi Pa Street, Tsuen Wan, Hong Kong. The school building consists of the hall, the laboratory wing, the classroom wing, and the new wing (completed in 2003). Ms. Tang Suk Ching is the current principal of the school, beginning her term in September 2016.

History
The school was founded in 1961, as the earliest secondary school in the Tsuen Wan District. Today it is recognised as one of the leading schools in Hong Kong in terms of academic results.
11 September 1961 was a memorable day to TWGSS. On that day, TWGSS opened. The first campus site was in the newly established Hoi Pa Street Government Primary School, where sixty-eight boys and seventy-five girls were accommodated temporarily. In September 1963, however, due to the lack of classrooms available for S1-S3 levels, the school was separated into A.M. and P. M. session. 25 June 1964 was another meaningful day to our school because on that day, old boys and girls moved to the new campus and thus the whole-day school arrangement resumed.

The opening ceremony of TWGSS was held on 25 November 1964. His Excellency the Governor, Sir David Trench, was invited to be the Guest of Honour to mark the opening of the school. A historical plaque of the grand opening ceremony can be found on the wall of the main lobby. It reads: "The school opened by His Excellency The Governor Sir David C.C. Trench K.C.M.G., M.C. on 25th November 1964."

Two survivors of the 2010 Manila hostage crisis, who were orphaned by the tragedy, were students of the school.

Academic results

Historically, more students at the school have received 10 A grades on the Hong Kong Certificate of Education Examination (HKCEE) (the highest grade possible on the HKCEE) than at any other secondary schools in Hong Kong. Out of over 572 secondary schools in Hong Kong, fewer than 30 have ever produced these so-called "10A" students. In particular, between 2000 and 2010, eight Tsuen Wan Government Secondary School students have received 10 A's in the Hong Kong Certificate of Education Examination (HKCEE) and 14 students have received 9 A's, ranking ninth among all secondary schools in Hong Kong.

In the Hong Kong Advanced Level Examination (HKALE), more than 30 students have received 5 A's, 4 A's or 3 A's between 2000 and 2010. The school received a relatively high number of A grades and A-C grades per student.

TWGSS counts a total of 12 winners of the Hong Kong Outstanding Students Awards, ranking seventh among all secondary schools in Hong Kong.

School facilities
31 air-conditioned classrooms and school hall, Audio-Visual Production & Broadcasting Centre, 3 Computer Assisted Learning Centres, Student Activity Centre, laboratories, Geography Room, Music Room, Music Centre, Language room, Home Economics Room, Art Room, Design and Technology Room, library, conference rooms, Lecture Room, badminton court and basketball court.

Extra-curricular activities
There are 4 houses, Bamboo (BA), Camphor (CA), Pine (PI) and Plum (PL). More than 30 clubs and societies of academic, service, sports or other interests are also organised.

Notable alumni
Government
Mr. Thomas Chan, GBS, JP Former Permanent Secretary for Transport & Housing (Housing) cum Director of Housing
Ms. CHANG King Yiu, JP Permanent Secretary for Constitutional & Mainland Affairs
Dr. Chuang Shuk-kwan JP, head of the Communicable Disease Branch of the Centre for Health Protection. 
Dr Chung Shui-ming, GBS, JP CPPCC National Committee member
Mr. FAN Wai Ming, Raymond, JP Deputy Secretary (Special Duties), Financial Services and the Treasury Bureau
Ms KWOK Suk Ching, Assistant Director-General for Industry (Hong Kong Government) and Assistant Director for Offshore Strategy (UK Government)
Prof. James Tin-Yau KWOK Associate Professor in Computer Science and Engineering, The Hong Kong University of Science and Technology
Miss LAU Lee Kwan, Vivian, JP Director of Food & Environment Hygiene
Ms. Lau Sau Yin Principal, Queen Elizabeth School Old Students' Association Secondary School

Flying and Aviation
Mr. CHIN Yiu Cheong, Francis, QS, JP  
President of Greater Bay Flying Club, President of Hong Kong Aircraft Owners and Pilots Association (AOPA-HONG KONG), Former Commander-in-Chief of Hong Kong Air Cadet Corps, Former Air Scout Commissioner of Hong  Kong Scout Association, Former Director of Hong Kong Aviation Club, Founder of 1661st and 180th Air Scout Group of the HK Scout Association, England-Hong Kong Long Distance Flying World Record Holder of 100-HP Single Engine  Light Aircraft Class 1971-1972

 Other
Dr. Law in Chak Honorary Clinical Associate Professor, The University of Hong Kong
Dr. Amelia N. Y. Lee, Head, Early Childhood and Elementary Education, School of Continuing Education, Hong Kong Baptist University
Prof. Kevin W.P. LEUNG CChem FRSC Professor Director, Applied Chemistry with Management Studies Programme, The Chinese University of Hong Kong
Ms. LI Mei Sheung, Michelle, JP Deputy Secretary for Education
Mr. LO Wai Shing Vincent, MH Principal, Evangel College
Mr. TSE Chin Wan, JP Deputy Director (Environmental Assessment), Environmental Protection Department
Education
Mr. Wong Kwan Yu, MH Principal, Fukien Secondary School (Siu Sai Wan)
 Ms Wong Suk Chee, Dorothy, the second Rhodes scholar from Hong Kong
Mr. YING Yiu Hong, Stanley, JP Permanent Secretary for Transport & Housing (Housing) cum Director of Housing

See also
 Education in Hong Kong
 List of schools in Hong Kong

References

External links

 
 Tsuen Wan Government Secondary School Alumni Association

Educational institutions established in 1961
Secondary schools in Hong Kong
Government schools in Hong Kong
Tsuen Wan
1961 establishments in Hong Kong